Media Molecule Ltd. is a British video game developer based in Guildford, Surrey. Founded in 2006 by Mark Healey, Alex Evans, David Smith, and Kareem Ettouney, Sony Computer Entertainment acquired the firm in 2010. It became part of SCE Worldwide Studios (now PlayStation Studios). The company is best known for developing the LittleBigPlanet series, 2013's Tearaway, and 2020's Dreams for PlayStation consoles.

Before the company's formation, the co-founders, led by Healey, developed Rag Doll Kung Fu, whilst working at Lionhead Studios. They left Lionhead in 2005 and presented an early precursor of LittleBigPlanet to Sony. Sony was interested, so in January 2006 they secured their funding from Sony for six months and Media Molecule was incorporated. The studio signed a deal with Sony Computer Entertainment Europe in June. This allowed Media Molecule to create LittleBigPlanet for the PlayStation 3, with Sony owning the intellectual property. Soon after, LittleBigPlanet began production; it was released in October 2008 to critical acclaim. Sony acquired Media Molecule for an undisclosed sum two years later.

In 2011, the developer released a sequel, LittleBigPlanet 2. LittleBigPlanet spawned a series of games developed by other studios, often in collaboration with Media Molecule. The studio has developed 2013's Tearaway and its extended remake, Tearaway Unfolded. In 2016, they opened a small studio in Brighton, East Sussex. Dreams was released in February 2020. The studio has won numerous awards, including Studio of the Year from the 2008 Spike Video Game Awards. Media Molecule's philosophy is to have as few employees as achievable.

History

Background (2005–2006) 

Four former Lionhead Studios' employees—Alex Evans, Kareem Ettouney, Mark Healey, and David Smith—founded Media Molecule, incorporating it on 4 January 2006. Chris Lee and Mags Hardwick are also among the founding team. Evans and Smith were both technical directors until 2020 when Evans left; Healey is the creative director whilst Ettouney was the art director.

Before the founding of Media Molecule, Evans and Healey worked at Bullfrog Productions for its co-founder Peter Molyneux. Molyneux later went on to co-found Lionhead Studios, with Evans and Healey being two of its first employees. Soon after, the co-founders, led primarily by Healey, developed Rag Doll Kung Fu in their spare time whilst working at Lionhead Studios. Healey demonstrated the game at the 2005 Game Developers Conference (GDC). Valve employees were in the audience because the firm was interested in the game. They were looking for a "low risk, low cost" third-party game to test on Steam; it became the first non-Valve game to be released on the platform in October 2005.

Also in 2005, whilst at Lionhead, the co-founders were working a game called The Room using clay tubes and portals. In retrospect, the founders noted it had similarities to 2007's Portal. They also demonstrated it at GDC 2005. The founders met with Valve who were interested in hiring them to develop The Room or another game idea, but nothing came of it. Evans noted if they had, Portal may not have been developed. The founders left Lionhead Studios in December 2005 and met with Sony Computer Entertainment (SCE) regarding a game idea.

LittleBigPlanet, formation, and Sony deal (2006–2008) 

They pitched an early precursor of what LittleBigPlanet was to become dubbed Craftworld to Phil Harrison, the head of development for Sony Worldwide Studios. Craftworld was a physics-based 2D side-scrolling game similar to LittleBigPlanet. Its main character was Mr. Yellowhead, who would later become Sackboy. Evans said that the pitch, which he described as "pretty vague", was "meant to be a 30-minute pitch for our idea for a game called Craftworld that soon turned into a three-hour brainstorming session". Despite this Sony were interested, partly because of Harrison's enthusiasm for the game, according to Smith. In January 2006, they secured their funding from Sony for six months. They set up their office, incorporated Media Molecule, and started pre-production of the game. Evans described the company's formation as a combination of the boost from Rag Doll Kung Fu, some new ideas bubbling in his head, and the new wave of consoles around the corner. In March, they moved into a studio in Guildford, Surrey; around this time Siobhan Reddy, the studio director, joined Media Molecule. Reddy is occasionally regarded as the fifth co-founder.

On 1 June 2006, Media Molecule announced they had signed an exclusive deal with SCE. This agreement allowed Media Molecule to create an original game exclusively for the PlayStation 3. The deal included SCE owning the intellectual property and that LittleBigPlanet would be available only on PlayStation consoles. Evans said, "SCE have proven to be the perfect partner for us. They immediately understood both our ambition for the game as well as our development style." Pre-production was extended until August when Media Molecule met with Sony executives, including Harrison, to decide whether to greenlight the game's production. Harrison described the pitch for production as the best meeting he had ever had. Media Molecule then started full development. In 2019, Harrison reaffirmed this sentiment, citing Evan's different approach. Instead of using PowerPoint, he wrote his own interactive 'PowerPoint' so that the game was playable through the presentation. Harrison said this demonstrated their innovative thinking and the way Media Molecule wanted to challenge conventions impressed him.

Phil Harrison announced LittleBigPlanet during his keynote appearance at the Game Developers Conference on 7 March 2007, in San Francisco; only upon arrival did Healey and others realise they were a part of his keynote with Healey. He noted that, "Sony were very, very much behind the game, much more than we had previously thought." The keynote included a demonstration by Healey, Evans, Harrison, and Peter Smith (senior producer on LittleBigPlanet) showing core gameplay elements throughout a game level and explaining players could create their own levels with tools provided to them within the game. LittleBigPlanet was one game that Sony considered fit their "Game 3.0" concept of user-generated content. Harrison originally suggested having LittleBigPlanet a free-to-play with downloadable content (DLC) along with a mechanism to monetise user-generated content to reward the best creators for their innovation. After viewing GDC 2007, Kenneth Young joined the studio in 2007 as their audio and music lead after being infatuated by LittleBigPlanet, Healey, and Evans. Some time before its release, the development of a sequel began. In July, Media Molecule had 28 employees. LittleBigPlanet was released between 27 October 2008 and 5 November across different regions. LittleBigPlanet was critically acclaimed by critics, winning over 90 awards including the Award for Artistic Achievement at the 5th British Academy Video Games Awards.

LittleBigPlanet sequel, new games, and Sony acquisition (2009–present) 
By January 2009, Media Molecule had 34 employees. A month later, it announced LittleBigPlanet for the PlayStation Portable at the Destination PlayStation meeting. SCE Cambridge Studio had been the primary developer, alongside Media Molecule. They released it in November to positive critical reviews. It was announced on 2 March 2010 that SCE had purchased Media Molecule for an undisclosed sum. Shuhei Yoshida, president of SIE Worldwide Studios, praised the studio's innovation and noted they had "world-class credentials". Evans added that, "Since Media Molecule's inception, we've had a uniquely close relationship with SCE. Over the years they have consistently shown their dedication to Creative Gaming and Media Molecule, not only through their support of the company, but their willingness to take risks and embrace our often unusual approach and ideas." It brought the total number of developers at SCE Worldwide Studios to fifteen. In May 2010, the company officially announced a sequel entitled LittleBigPlanet 2; the released it in January 2011 to critical acclaim. In June, it was confirmed that LittleBigPlanet PS Vita was not being developed by Media Molecule but by Double Eleven, Tarsier Studios and XDev.

Development of Tearaway began in May 2011. In July at Gamelab 2011 in Barcelona, Reddy announced that Media Molecule were stepping away from LittleBigPlanet to focus on new game ideas. Media Molecule added on Twitter that they would always be involved in LittleBigPlanet to some degree. In July at a Develop conference, the co-founders said they were still involved with LittleBigPlanet 2 pointing to the upcoming PlayStation Move level pack as an example of their on-going work. Healey remarked that, "It's a bit like, if you think of LittleBigPlanet as having a child, Sackboy was our child, you get to the stage where they want to leave home, It's kind of like that." Evans elaborated by saying that Media Molecule is no longer a "single-threaded company" and noted developing similar games all the time would become stale. In January 2012, Media Molecule had spent  on research and development on new, innovative games aiming to reduce the reliance on the LittleBigPlanet brand name.

In August 2012, they announced Tearaway led by Smith and Rex Crowle, with 15 developers working on it. The rest of the studio was working on another project—Dreams—which was in the research and development phase. Around this time, Media Molecule had over 40 employees. They released Tearaway in November 2013 for the PlayStation Vita. In March 2015, Young left Media Molecule to become a game audio freelancer, though he continued working on Unfolded. Two years later, Media Molecule and Tarsier Studios released Tearaway Unfolded, an expanded remake of Tearaway for the PlayStation 4. Crowle and LittleBigPlanet programmer, Moo Yu, founded Foam Sword in November 2015 and released their debut title Knights and Bikes in August 2019.

Whilst Media Molecule may have moved away from LittleBigPlanet, they have collaborated with other studios and contributed to new games. This includes: 2009's LittleBigPlanet, 2010's Sackboy's Prehistoric Moves, 2012's LittleBigPlanet Karting, and 2014's LittleBigPlanet 3.

In October 2016, Media Molecule opened Media Molecule Brighton a 'satellite' (small) studio in Brighton, East Sussex. They opened this workspace to accommodate a group of developers who had been commuting to and from their headquarters, allowing them to reduce travel times. The venue where the office is located is called the "Lighthouse" and hosts offices for other organisations like Culture24.

The company announced Dreams, a sandbox video game with a game creation system, at Sony Interactive Entertainment's press conference at E3 2015. In April 2019, the game was made available via early access, a first for a Sony game. In December 2019, Sony announced a February 2020 release date which it met.

In September 2020, Evans announced he was leaving after serving for 13 years as a technical director at the studio, saying he wanted a break from game development. He has since joined Nvidia as a researcher. In December of 2022, Ettouney announced he was leaving the company in January 2023.

Philosophy
Media Molecule aims to have as few employees as possible. In 2006, Evans said that Media Molecule wants to stay as small as possible whilst being able to produce a AAA game, aiming to keep the number of employees below thirty. Healey said, "I am really intent on keeping us a small focused team. I've had enough of working on big, bloated teams, you get too much deadwood in those situations. Everyone at Media Molecule matters." Healey added there are always tensions between people in development, however, once there are too many they can cause tensions comparing it to being in a soap opera. Media Molecule now has around 50 employees.

Other game developers have adopted this policy, most notably Hideo Kojima of Kojima Productions. After visiting Media Molecule in 2016, when he was re-establishing the company, Kojima modelled the new studio around Media Molecule, wanting "a small, intimate type of studio". Kojima praised the high number of female employees and the relaxed atmosphere comparing it to a family. He set a limit of one hundred employees at Kojima Productions, similar to Media Molecule.

Games

LittleBigPlanet (2008–2014)

As the creator of the LittleBigPlanet series Media Molecule developed the first two games—LittleBigPlanet (2008) and LittleBigPlanet 2 (2011) for the PlayStation 3—in addition to co-developing the PlayStation Portable version of the same name (2009) with SCE Cambridge Studio, the primary developer. It is a series of puzzle platformer games that follow Sackboy a small, brown, anthropomorphic, humanoid creature made of fabric with a zip fastener and button eyes across a variety of levels. The series features user-generated content, allowing players to create levels which can be shared and played by others online. The three games have collectively sold 8.5million units. Sackboy has featured in every LittleBigPlanet game and is a mascot for the PlayStation brand. In 2011, Media Molecule stepped away from the LittleBigPlanet series.
Despite this, they have collaborated and contributed with other studios for other games in the series, including Sackboy's Prehistoric Moves (2010), LittleBigPlanet Karting (2012), and LittleBigPlanet 3 (2014).

Tearaway (2013–2015)

Media Molecule created the Tearaway series and developed Tearaway (2013) for the PlayStation Vita and co-developed Tearaway Unfolded (2015), an expanded remake of the earlier game, for the PlayStation 4 with Tarsier Studios. Tearaway is a platform-adventure game that follows Iota or Atoi through a world made of paper. The game utilises the PlayStation Vita's numerous sensors and inputs when interacting with the in-game environment like the rear touchpad, touchscreen, and cameras. Both games received "generally favourable reviews" according to review aggregator Metacritic.

Dreams (2020–present)

Dreams is a game creation system allowing players to create and share their own levels similar to that of LittleBigPlanet. Players can create games from a range of different genres including point-and-click adventures, puzzle-platformers, and shoot'em ups. Players interact with the game's world by controlling an "imp", similar to a mouse cursor, to create new items and characters. Released in February 2020, it received "generally favourable reviews" according to review aggregator Metacritic.

Awards

Notes

References

External links 
 

Media Molecule
2006 establishments in England
2010 mergers and acquisitions
British companies established in 2006
British subsidiaries of foreign companies
Companies based in Guildford
First-party video game developers
LittleBigPlanet
PlayStation Studios
Spike Video Game Award winners
Video game companies established in 2006
Video game companies of the United Kingdom
Video game development companies